Rudolf Edinger (22 November 1902 – 4 May 1997) was an Austrian weightlifter. He won a world title in the lightweight (under 67.5 kg) category in 1923 and set two world records in press in 1926 and 1927. He competed at the 1924 Summer Olympics as middleweight and finished in 24th place.

References

1902 births
1997 deaths
Austrian male weightlifters
Olympic weightlifters of Austria
People associated with physical culture
Weightlifters at the 1924 Summer Olympics
20th-century Austrian people